The Broad Ax (1895–1931) was a weekly newspaper that began publication on Aug. 31, 1895, originally in Salt Lake City, Utah, by Julius F. Taylor. After a series of conflicts with the Latter Day Saints, Taylor relocated the newspaper to Chicago, Illinois in 1899. The Broad Ax has been described as "the most controversial black newspaper in Chicago in the late nineteenth century," in some ways due to its criticism of Booker T. Washington and Tuskegee Institute. The paper covered African American cinema.

The last known surviving issue of The Broad Ax is dated September 10, 1927, but an obituary for Taylor published in The Chicago Defender states that the newspaper ceased publication in 1931.

Issues for years 1895–1922 have been digitized and are available for free online at Chronicling America and the University of Illinois Library's Illinois Digital Newspaper Collections.

References

External links
 Chronicling America: About The Broad Ax
 Illinois Digital Newspaper Collections: The Broad Ax (1895-1922)

Defunct newspapers published in Utah
Defunct newspapers published in Illinois
Publications established in 1895
Publications disestablished in 1931
Defunct African-American newspapers